The men's foil was one of eight fencing events on the fencing at the 1972 Summer Olympics programme. It was the sixteenth appearance of the event. The competition was held from 29 to 30 August 1972. 57 fencers from 25 nations competed. Nations had been limited to three fencers each since 1928. The event was won by Witold Woyda of Poland, the nation's second victory in the men's foil in three Games. Jenő Kamuti of Hungary repeated as the silver medalist, the seventh man to win multiple medals in the event. France took bronze for the third consecutive Games, this time with Christian Noël earning the honor.

Background

This was the 16th appearance of the event, which has been held at every Summer Olympics except 1908 (when there was a foil display only rather than a medal event). Four of the six finalists from 1968 returned: silver medalist (and 1964 fifth-place finisher) Jenő Kamuti of Hungary, two-time bronze medalist Daniel Revenu of France, fourth-place finisher Christian Noël of France, and sixth-place finisher Mihai Țiu of Romania. Vasyl Stankovych of the Soviet Union was the reigning world champion; Friedrich Wessel of West Germany had won the previous two. Another significant contender was Witold Woyda, who had ten world championship and Olympic medals for the Polish foil team (and an individual silver at the 1962 world championship).

Hong Kong and Israel each made their debut in the men's foil. The United States made its 15th appearance, most of any nation, having missed only the inaugural 1896 competition.

Competition format

After two Games of hybrid pool/knockout play, the 1972 tournament returned to an all-pool format, with each fencer facing the other fencers in the pool in a round robin. Bouts were to 5 touches. There were no barrages; ties were broken by touch quotient: touches scored divided by touches received. Unlike previous Games, all bouts were finished in the round robins. The 1972 format also eliminated the 8-fencer final pools of previous Games; for all rounds after the first, the number of fencers was set at 6.

There were five rounds:
 Round 1 (or "eliminating round"): The 57 fencers were divided into 9 pools, mostly of 6 fencers each but some with 7. The top 4 fencers in each pool advanced; this narrowed the field from 57 to 36.
 Round 2 (or "1/8 finals"): The 36 fencers were divided into 6 pools of 6 fencers each. The top 4 fencers in each pool advanced, cutting the field from 36 to 24.
 Quarterfinals: With 24 fencers remaining, there were 4 pools of 6 fencers each. Now, only the top 3 in each pool advanced. This split the field in half, from 24 to 12.
 Semifinals: There were 2 pools of 6 fencers each. Again, only the top 3 advanced, resulting in a final pool of 6.
 Final: The final pool featured the remaining 6 fencers.

Schedule

All times are Central European Time (UTC+1)

Results

Round 1

Round 1 Pool A

Round 1 Pool B

Round 1 Pool C

Round 1 Pool D

Round 1 Pool E 

The four-way tie for 3rd place was broken by touch quotient (touches scored divided by touches received). Benko was highest at 0.950, then Losert at 0.944; those two qualified for the next round at 3rd and 4th place. Salvat (0.933) and Darricau (0.714) were eliminated.

Round 1 Pool F 

The three-way tie for third place was broken by touch quotient (touches for divided by touches against). Paul (1.250) and Simon (1.182) each scored more touches than they received, while Lupiz (0.917) was hit more often than he connected. The former two advanced.

Round 1 Pool G

Round 1 Pool H

Round 1 Pool I 
The three-way tie for third place was broken by touch quotient (touches for divided by touches against). Nakajima, despite losing more matches than he win, had actually scored more touches than he received—a quotient of 1.125. Gil was second among the tied fencers, with a quotient of 0.875; he advanced along with Nakajima. Obst was eliminated, at 0.700 and last among the tied men.

Round 2

Round 2 Pool A

Round 2 Pool B

Round 2 Pool C

Round 2 Pool D

Round 2 Pool E 
The three-way tie for third was broken by touch quotient. Serizawa was even on touches for and touches received, at 1.000. Wessel was at 17–21 (0.810), beating Breckin by one touch for at 16–21 (0.762). Breckin, at fifth place, was eliminated.

Round 2 Pool F

Quarterfinals

Quarterfinal Pool A

Quarterfinal Pool B

Quarterfinal Pool C

Quarterfinal Pool D

Semifinals

Semifinal Pool A

Semifinal Pool B

Final 
The tie for bronze was determined on touch quotient, with Noël (1.000) winning it followed by Țiu (0.850) and Denisov (0.810).

References

Foil men
Men's events at the 1972 Summer Olympics